Briton Ferry West railway station served the town of Briton Ferry, in the historical county of Glamorganshire, Wales, from 1895 to 1935 on the South Wales Railway.

History 
The station was opened as Briton Ferry on 2 September 1850 by the South Wales Railway. It closed on 8 July 1935, being replaced by the newer Briton Ferry station to the north.

References 

Disused railway stations in Neath Port Talbot
Railway stations in Great Britain opened in 1850
Railway stations in Great Britain closed in 1935
1895 establishments in Wales
1935 disestablishments in Wales